Pterolophia caballina is a species of beetle in the family Cerambycidae. It was described by Gressitt in 1951, originally under the genus Lychrosis.

References

caballina
Beetles described in 1951